José Emilio Rabasa Estebanell (1856—1930), Mexican writer, diplomat and liberal politician
Emilio Óscar Rabasa Mishkin (1925–2008), Mexican politician and diplomat
George Rabasa (born 1941), American writer
Rabasa Cycles, a bicycles company which was founded in 1922
A ward in the city of Alicante, Spain
An alternate name for the Rabisu, evil vampiric demons in Akkadian mythology